George Boyle Hanna (1906–1 March 1964) (PC (NI), was an Ulster Unionist member of the Parliament of Northern Ireland. He represented Belfast Duncairn from 1949 to 1956.

Born in Ballymena, County Antrim, he was the son of George Boyle Hanna. He was educated at Ballymena Academy, the Royal Belfast Academical Institution and Queen's University Belfast, he was called to the Bar in 1927 and became a King's Counsel in 1946. He was Commissioner for the Unionist Party in Armagh from 1934 to 1941.

He served in the Cabinet of Sir Basil Brooke as Minister of Home Affairs from 1953 to 1956 and then for five months in 1956 as Minister of Finance (de facto Deputy Prime Minister), before resigning from Government and from Parliament upon his appointment as a county court judge for County Down. He died on 1 March 1964.

Sources
Biographies of Members of the Northern Ireland House of Commons
The Government of Northern Ireland

References

1906 births
1964 deaths
People from Ballymena
Ulster Unionist Party members of the House of Commons of Northern Ireland
Members of the House of Commons of Northern Ireland 1949–1953
Members of the House of Commons of Northern Ireland 1953–1958
Members of the Privy Council of Northern Ireland
Northern Ireland Cabinet ministers (Parliament of Northern Ireland)
Judges in Northern Ireland
20th-century Irish lawyers
Ministers of Finance of Northern Ireland
Northern Ireland King's Counsel
Members of the House of Commons of Northern Ireland for Belfast constituencies